William Henry Comstock (August 1, 1830 – March 9, 1919) was an American/Canadian businessman and politician.

Born in Batavia, New York, Comstock was educated in Flushing, New York, and on leaving school started work as a clerk. He started his business in 1854, William H. Comstock Company, Ltd., which sold patent medicine including Dr. Morse's Indian Root Pills, Dead Shot Pellets and McKenzus Dead Shot Worm Candy. He was a town councillor and mayor of Brockville, Ontario. He twice ran unsuccessfully as the Liberal candidate for the House of Commons of Canada for the riding of Brockville in the 1882 and 1887 elections, before being elected in an 1899 by-election resulting from the death of the sitting MP, John Fisher Wood. He did not run in 1900.

On Mr. Wood's death, 14 March 1899:

References
 The Canadian album : men of Canada; or, Success by example, in religion, patriotism, business, law, medicine, education and agriculture; containing portraits of some of Canada's chief business men, statesmen, farmers, men of the learned professions, and others; also, an authentic sketch of their lives; object lessons for the present generation and examples to posterity (Volume 4) (1891-1896)
 
 WILLIAM H. COMSTOCK COMPANY, LIMITED PAPERS

1830 births
1919 deaths
American emigrants to Canada
Liberal Party of Canada MPs
Members of the House of Commons of Canada from Ontario
Mayors of Brockville
Patent medicine businesspeople